Feng Yuanzhen may refer to:
Yuan-Cheng Fung (born 1919), Chinese-born American scientist and engineer
Abby Fung (born 1982), Taiwanese actress

See also
Feng Yuanzheng (born 1962), Chinese actor